JZL184 is an irreversible inhibitor for monoacylglycerol lipase (MAGL), the primary enzyme responsible for degrading the endocannabinoid 2-arachidonoylglycerol (2-AG). It displays high selectivity for MAGL over other brain serine hydrolases, including the anandamide-degrading enzyme fatty acid amide hydrolase (FAAH), thereby making it a useful tool for studying the effects of endogenous 2-AG signaling, in vivo.  Administration of JZL184 to mice was reported to cause dramatic elevation of brain 2-AG leading to several cannabinoid-related behavioral effects.

See also
 JZL195

References

Cannabinoids
Benzodioxoles
Tertiary alcohols
Piperidines
Carbamates
Nitrobenzenes